James Patrick Quinn (19 February 1930  – 18 January 1986) was an English rugby union, and professional rugby league footballer who played in the 1950s.

Background
Pat Quinn was born in Widnes, Lancashire, England, he was a teacher at the  County Secondary School in Harehills, Leeds during the 1950s, and he died aged 55 in Leicester, Leicestershire

Playing career

Challenge Cup Final appearances
Pat Quinn played , and scored a try in Leeds' 9-7 victory over Barrow in the 1957 Challenge Cup Final during the 1956–57 season at Wembley Stadium, London on Saturday 11 May 1957, in front of a crowd of 76,318.

References

External links
Search for "Quinn" at rugbyleagueproject.org
Rugby League Final 1957 at britishpathe.com
Union Lions have rich history with Rhinos
Statistics at lionsrugby.com
Code Change

1930 births
1986 deaths
British & Irish Lions rugby union players from England
England international rugby union players
English rugby league players
English people of Irish descent
Lancashire County RFU players
Lancashire rugby league team players
Leeds Rhinos players
New Brighton F.C. players
Rugby union centres
Rugby league fullbacks
Rugby league players from Widnes